Timothy James Curry (born 19 April 1946) is an English actor and singer. He rose to prominence for his portrayal of Dr. Frank-N-Furter in the film The Rocky Horror Picture Show (1975), reprising the role he had originated in the 1973 London and 1974 Los Angeles musical stage productions of The Rocky Horror Show.

Curry's other stage work includes various roles in the original West End production of Hair, Tristan Tzara in the 1975 West End and Broadway productions of Travesties, Wolfgang Amadeus Mozart in the 1980 Broadway production of Amadeus, Alan Swann in the Broadway production of My Favourite Year, and King Arthur in Broadway and West End productions of Spamalot from 2005 to 2007. His theatre accolades include three Tony Award nominations and two Laurence Olivier Award nominations.

Curry received further acclaim for his film and television roles, including Rooster Hannigan in the film adaptation of Annie (1982), Darkness in Legend (1985), Wadsworth in Clue (1985), Pennywise in the miniseries It (1990), the Concierge in Home Alone 2: Lost in New York (1992), Cardinal Richelieu in The Three Musketeers (1993), and Long John Silver in Muppet Treasure Island (1996). He has also gained acclaim for his voice acting roles, including his Daytime Emmy Award-winning performance as Captain Hook on Peter Pan & the Pirates (1990–1991), Hexxus in FernGully: The Last Rainforest (1992), Sir Nigel Thornberry on The Wild Thornberrys (1998–2004), and Chancellor Palpatine / Darth Sidious on Star Wars: The Clone Wars (2012–2014).

As a singer, Curry has released three rock-focused studio albums: Read My Lips (1978), Fearless (1979), and Simplicity (1981).

Early life
Timothy James Curry was born on 19 April 1946 in Grappenhall, Cheshire, the son of school secretary Patricia (died June 1999) and Royal Navy chaplain James Curry. His father died from pneumonia in 1958, when Curry was 12 years old. His elder sister, Judith, was a concert pianist who died of a brain tumour in 2001. Curry spent most of his childhood in Plymouth. After his father's death, his family moved to South London, where he went to boarding school before attending Kingswood School in Bath, Somerset. He developed into a talented boy soprano (treble). Deciding to concentrate on acting, he graduated from the University of Birmingham with a combined BA in English and drama in 1968.

Career

Acting

Rocky Horror
Curry's first full-time role was as part of the original London cast of the musical Hair in 1968, where he met Richard O'Brien, who went on to write Curry's next full-time role, that of Dr. Frank-N-Furter in The Rocky Horror Show (1973). Curry recalled his first encounter with the project:

Originally, Curry rehearsed the character with a German accent and peroxide blond hair, and later, with an American accent. In March 2005, in an interview with Terry Gross of NPR's Fresh Air, he explains that he decided to play Dr. Frank-N-Furter with an English accent after listening to an English woman say, "Do you have a house in town or a house in the country", and decided, "Yes, [Dr. Frank-N-Furter] should sound like the Queen".

Curry originally thought the character was merely a laboratory doctor dressed in a white lab coat. However, at the suggestion of director Sharman, the character evolved into the diabolical mad scientist and transvestite with an upper-class Belgravia accent. An immediate hit, a reviewer at the premiere in London in June 1973 wrote Curry gives a "garishly Bowiesque performance as the ambisextrous doctor." This change carried over to the 1975 film adaptation, The Rocky Horror Picture Show, which made Curry a household name and gave him a cult following. He continued to play the character in London, Los Angeles, and New York City until 1975.

In an interview with NPR, Curry called Rocky Horror a "rite of passage", and added that the film is "a guaranteed weekend party to which you can go with or without a date and probably find one if you don't have one, and it's also a chance for people to try on a few roles for size, you know? Figure out, help them maybe figure out their own sexuality".

In 2016, Curry played The Criminologist in the television film remake of The Rocky Horror Picture Show.

Theatre

Shortly after the end of Rocky Horrors run on Broadway, Curry returned to the stage with Tom Stoppard's Travesties, which ran in London and New York from 1975 to 1976. Travesties was a Broadway hit. It won two Tony Awards (Best Performance by an Actor for John Wood and Best Comedy), as well as the New York Drama Critics Circle Award (Best Play), and Curry's performance as the famous dadaist Tristan Tzara received good reviews.

In 1981, Curry formed part of the original cast in the Broadway show Amadeus, playing the title character, Wolfgang Amadeus Mozart. He was nominated for his first Tony Award (Best Performance by a Leading Actor in a Play) for this role but lost out to his co-star Ian McKellen, who played Antonio Salieri. In 1982, Curry took the part of the Pirate King in the Drury Lane production of Joe Papp's version of The Pirates of Penzance opposite George Cole, earning enthusiastic reviews.

In the mid-1980s, Curry performed in The Rivals and in several plays with the Royal National Theatre of Great Britain, including The Threepenny Opera, Dalliance and Love For Love. In 1988, he did the national tour of Me and My Girl in the lead role of Bill Snibson, a role originated on Broadway by Robert Lindsay and followed by Jim Dale. In 1989–90, Curry returned once again to the New York stage in The Art of Success, and in 1993 played Alan Swann in the Broadway musical version of My Favorite Year, earning him his second Tony Award nomination, this time for Best Performance by a Leading Actor in a Musical. In 2001, he appeared as Scrooge in the musical version of A Christmas Carol that played at Madison Square Garden.

In 2004, Curry began his role of King Arthur in Spamalot in Chicago. Written by Monty Python member Eric Idle and based on Monty Python and the Holy Grail, the show successfully moved to Broadway in February 2005. It sold more than $1 million worth of tickets in its first 24 hours. His performance brought him a third Tony nomination, again for Best Performance by a Leading Actor in a Musical. Curry reprised this role at the Palace Theatre in London's West End, where Spamalot opened on 16 October 2006. His final performance came on 6 January 2007. He was nominated for a Laurence Olivier Award as the Best Actor in a Musical for the role, and also won the Theatregoers' Choice Award (getting 39% of the votes cast by over 12,000 theatregoers) as Best Actor in a Musical.

From May to August 2011, Curry was scheduled to portray the Player in a Trevor Nunn stage production of Tom Stoppard's Rosencrantz and Guildenstern Are Dead at the Chichester Festival Theatre and then in London. He withdrew from the production on 27 May, citing ill health. From 26 to 29 April 2012, Tim Curry appeared in Eric Idle's play What About Dick? at the Orpheum Theatre in Los Angeles. He had originally appeared in the play back in 2007 when it was still a work in progress.

Curry's career in theatre was honoured on 7 June 2015 at the Actors Fund's 19th annual Tony Awards Viewing Party, where he was awarded an Artistic Achievement Award.

Film
After The Rocky Horror Picture Show, Curry began to appear in many films, acting in supporting roles, such as Robert Graves in the British horror film The Shout, as Johnny LaGuardia in Times Square, as Daniel Francis "Rooster" Hannigan in the 1982 film version of Annie, and as Jeremy Hancock in the political film The Ploughman's Lunch.

In 1985, Curry starred in the fantasy film Legend as The Lord of Darkness. Director Ridley Scott cast Curry in the film after watching him in Rocky Horror, thinking he was ideal to play the role of Darkness. It took five and a half hours to apply the makeup needed for Darkness onto Curry and at the end of the day, he would spend an hour in a bath in order to liquefy the soluble spirit gum. The same year, he appeared in the comedy mystery film Clue as Wadsworth the butler.

After this, Curry began to be cast in more comedy roles throughout the late 1980s and '90s such as Rev. Ray Porter in Pass the Ammo, Dr. Thornton Poole in Oscar, Mr. Hector the suspicious Plaza Hotel concierge in Home Alone 2: Lost in New York, Jigsaw in Loaded Weapon 1 and as Long John Silver in Muppet Treasure Island. Although he featured in mostly comedies throughout the '90s, he did appear in some action films, such as the thriller The Hunt for Red October as Dr. Yevgeniy Petrov, the 1993 adaptation of The Three Musketeers as Cardinal Richelieu, in the superhero film The Shadow as Farley Claymore, and as Herkermer Homolka in the 1995 action adventure Congo. He also starred in the 1998 direct-to-video film Addams Family Reunion playing the role of Gomez Addams.

In the early 2000s, Curry was cast in the film adaptation of Charlie's Angels in the role of Roger Corwin, and in the parody film Scary Movie 2 playing Professor Oldman. Curry went on to play Thurman Rice, a supporting role in the biographical film Kinsey. In later years, Curry has mostly performed voice roles for animated films and television series. His last feature film onscreen role to date has been in the British black comedy Burke & Hare as Alexander Monro.

Television
Curry started his career with small roles in television series, such as Eugene in Napoleon and Love, and guest roles in Armchair Theatre and Play for Today including as 'Glen' in Dennis Potter's "Schmoedipus".

Curry also appeared in the "Dead Dog Records" storyline of the television series crime drama Wiseguy, as Winston Newquay. He also had recurring roles on the short-lived science fiction television series Earth 2 and the sitcom Rude Awakening.

He has also guest starred on other series such as The Tracey Ullman Show, Roseanne, Tales from the Crypt (which earned him an Emmy award nomination), The Naked Truth, Lexx, Monk, Will & Grace, Psych, Agatha Christie's Poirot and Criminal Minds.

Curry also performed in many television films and miniseries, including Three Men in a Boat, the titular role in Will Shakespeare, playing the role of Bill Sikes in a television adaptation of Oliver Twist, Blue Money, The Worst Witch, Titanic, Terry Pratchett's The Colour of Magic, Alice, Jackie's Back, Return to Cranford,  and many more.

Although Curry has appeared in numerous television series throughout his career he has only had lead roles in two live-action series: Over the Top, a sitcom that he also produced, and the revival series of Family Affair. Both were cancelled after one season.

One of Curry's best-known television roles (and best-known roles overall) is as Pennywise the Clown in the 1990 horror miniseries Stephen King's It. Aside from one Fangoria interview in 1990, Curry never publicly acknowledged his involvement in It until an interview with Moviefone in 2015, where he called the role of Pennywise "a wonderful part", giving his blessing to successor Will Poulter; Poulter was set to play the character in the reboot, although ultimately dropped out. Bill Skarsgård replaced Poulter, and while being interviewed at Fan Expo Canada, Curry gave his approval, saying "I like [Bill] Skarsgård. I think he's very clever. It'll be interesting to see what sort of clown face he puts on. because it's not an obvious clown face at all.[..] So I'm fascinated to see it."

Voice acting
Curry has appeared in such animated television series and films, starting with the performance of the Serpent in The Greatest Adventure: Stories from the Bible. Curry won a Daytime Emmy Award for his performance as Captain Hook in the Fox animated series Peter Pan and the Pirates.  His longest-running animated role was as Nigel Thornberry in The Wild Thornberrys, which ran for five seasons on Nickelodeon.

Curry was mainly known for villainous roles in animated series such as  Konk in The Pirates of Dark Water, MAL in Captain Planet and the Planeteers, Skullmaster in Mighty Max, the Evil Manta in The Little Mermaid, Dr Anton Sevarius in Gargoyles, Kilokahn in Superhuman Samurai Syber-Squad, 'King' Chicken in Duckman, Taurus Bullba in Darkwing Duck, Lord Dragaunus in The Mighty Ducks, as various characters Dinosaurs, Professor Finbarr Calamitous in The Adventures of Jimmy Neutron: Boy Genius, Slagar the Cruel in Redwall, Doctor Morocco in Transformers: Rescue Bots, G. Gordon Godfrey in Young Justice, The Sorcerer in Randy Cunningham: 9th Grade Ninja, and Auntie Whispers in Over the Garden Wall. He also became the voice of Chancellor Palpatine/Darth Sidious in Star Wars: The Clone Wars upon the death of Ian Abercrombie.

He also appeared in a number of animated films such as FernGully: The Last Rainforest, The Pebble and the Penguin, Beauty and the Beast: The Enchanted Christmas, Scooby-Doo! and the Witch's Ghost, Barbie in the Nutcracker, The Cat Returns, Garfield: A Tail of Two Kitties, and many more.

Curry has also lent his voice to numerous video games, such as playing the titular character in Gabriel Knight: Sins of the Fathers and Gabriel Knight 3: Blood of the Sacred, Blood of the Damned, Toonstruck, Sacrifice, Brütal Legend and Dragon Age: Origins. A cutscene of Curry in Red Alert 3, portraying Soviet Premier Cherdenko, has gone viral as a meme.

His audiobook work includes Lemony Snicket's A Series of Unfortunate Events, Geraldine McCaughrean's Peter Pan in Scarlet, Charles Dickens' A Christmas Carol, Bram Stoker's Dracula and the Abhorsen trilogy by Garth Nix.

Curry has done voice over for various advertisement for products and companies such as Smirnoff, Cravendale and Paramount Network.

Music
Aside from his performances on various soundtrack records, Curry has had some success as a solo musical artist. Curry received classical vocal training as a boy. He has mentioned that his musical influences included jazz vocalists such as Billie Holiday and Louis Armstrong and he idolised the Beatles and the Rolling Stones as a teenager. In 1978, A&M Records released Curry's debut solo album Read My Lips. The album featured an eclectic range of songs (mostly covers) performed in diverse genres. Highlights of the album are a reggae version of the Beatles' song "I Will", a rendition of "Wake Nicodemus" featuring the Pipes and Drums of the 48th Highlanders of Canada, and a bar-room ballad, "Alan", composed by Canadian singer-songwriter Tony Kosinec.  In 1979 he scored a hit with "I do the Rock"

The following year, Curry released his second and most successful album Fearless. The LP was more rock-oriented than Read My Lips and mostly featured original songs rather than cover versions. The record included Curry's only US charting songs: "I Do the Rock" and "Paradise Garage".

Curry's third and final album, Simplicity, was released in 1981, again by A&M Records. This record, which did not sell as well as the previous offerings, combined both original songs and cover versions. Still, it was the only Curry recording to hit the charts in Canada, reaching No. 45 on the album chart. The writing, production, and musician roster for Curry's solo albums included an impressive list of collaborators, including Bob Ezrin, Dick Wagner, and David Sanborn.

In 1989, A&M released The Best of Tim Curry on CD and cassette, featuring songs from his albums (including a live version of "Alan") and a previously unreleased song, a live cover version of Bob Dylan's "Simple Twist of Fate".

Curry toured North America and some European countries with his band between 1978 and 1980.

In 1990 Curry performed as the Prosecutor in Roger Waters' production of The Wall – Live in Berlin.

Although Curry's first album was released in 1978, he had previously recorded a nine-track album for Lou Adler's Ode Records in 1976. However, the album remained unreleased in its entirety until February 2010, when it was made available as a legal download entitled ...From the Vaults (though four tracks from these sessions had been released on a 1990 Rocky Horror box set). The album, produced by Adler, included Curry's rendition of The Supremes' hit "Baby Love".

Personal life
Curry has used a wheelchair since having a major stroke in July 2012. As a result, he has shifted his work mostly to voice acting, although he has continued to perform as a singer and make appearances at fan conventions.

From the mid-1970s Curry was close friends with Freddie Mercury after the Queen singer had seen Curry in both the London stage production of The Rocky Horror Show and its 1975 film version. A keen horticulturalist, Curry later told the UK edition of House And Garden magazine about designing Mercury's garden: "Freddie came back from a tour and said, 'The garden, dear, it’s dead.' I said, 'What? Did you water it?' And Freddie said, 'Water it, dear?'" Both Curry and Mercury were also close friends with Peter Straker, with Straker starring with Curry in the London production of Hair.

In October 2020, Tim Curry reprised his role as Dr. Frank-N-Furter in a live table reading of The Rocky Horror Picture Show in support of the Democratic Party of Wisconsin to raise funds for Joe Biden's presidential campaign.

Filmography

Discography
Albums
 Read My Lips (1978)
 Fearless (1979)
 Simplicity (1981)
 The Best of Tim Curry (1985; compilation album)
 From the Vaults (recorded 1976, released 2010)

Soundtracks and cast recordings
 The Rocky Horror Show (Original London cast) (1973)
 The Rocky Horror Show (Original Roxy cast) (1974)
 The Rocky Horror Picture Show (1975)
 Annie (1982)
 Ferngully: The Last Rainforest (1992)
 My Favorite Year (Original Broadway cast) (1993)
 The Pebble and the Penguin (1995)
 Muppet Treasure Island (1996)
 Beauty and the Beast: The Enchanted Christmas (1997)
 Spamalot (Original Broadway cast) (2005)
 The Rocky Horror Picture Show: Let's Do the Time Warp Again (2016)

Others
Spy (1979) –  Backing vocals for "Vengeance" and "Pure Sin"
The Wall – Live in Berlin (1990)  – Live recording of "The Trial"
Little Tramp (1992) – Concept album for musical
Disney's Music From the Park (1996) – "The Ballad of Davy Crockett"

Awards and nominations

Notes

References

External links

 
 
 
 
 
 
 
 
 
 
 
 

|-

1946 births
Living people
20th-century English male actors
21st-century English male actors
Actors with disabilities
Alumni of the University of Birmingham
Audiobook narrators
British expatriate male actors in the United States
Daytime Emmy Award winners
English expatriates in the United States
English male film actors
English male musical theatre actors
English male Shakespearean actors
English male singers
English male stage actors
English male television actors
English male video game actors
English male voice actors
People educated at Kingswood School, Bath
People from Bath, Somerset
People from Grappenhall and Thelwall
People from Toluca Lake, Los Angeles
Royal Shakespeare Company members
Wheelchair users